The FIM Motocross Junior World Championship is a motorcross championship for younger riders, inaugurated in 2004, and is a feeder series to the FIM Motocross World Championship.

Champions

External links
2014 champions

Motocross World Championship